Hilauli is a village in Purwa tehsil of Unnao district, Uttar Pradesh, India. It is located on the road from Maurawan to Bachhrawan in Rae Bareli district, near the banks of the Sai. Hilauli hosts a market twice per week, on sunday and Thursdays, with grain and vegetables being the main items bought and sold. As of 2011, the population of Hilauli is 13,318, in 2,533 households.

Hilauli also serves as the headquarters of a community development block, which encompasses 68 villages (including Hilauli itself) and has a total population of 178,460 people in 32,880 households.

History 
According to oral tradition, Hilauli was founded by two Kayasths named Hanuman and Banwari. Folklore holds that the field of Madhab, a Thakur who once lived here, never needs irrigation, no matter how dry the weather gets. Hilauli historically lay in the pargana of Maurawan.

At the turn of the 20th century, Hilauli was described as "a very large village... pleasantly situated among mango groves in a sandy soil near the river Sai". It hosted "a considerable market" twice per week, and it had one school and a small mosque. Its population in 1901 was 4,340, with a large Chhatri population and a small Muslim minority of 260.

The 1961 census recorded Hilauli as comprising 16 hamlets, with a total population of 5,594 (2,801 male and 2,793 female), in 960 households and 860 physical houses. The area of the village was given as 6,055 acres. Average attendance of the biweekly market was about 200 people.

Villages 
Hilauli CD block has the following 68 villages:

References

Villages in Unnao district
Community development blocks in India